Trumpet Rhapsody (also released as Maynard Ferguson '69) is an album released by Canadian jazz trumpeter Maynard Ferguson featuring tracks recorded in 1967 and originally released on the MPS label.

Reception

AllMusic states "the great trumpeter sticks mostly to ballads, showcasing his tone and sometimes his range with restraint and an accent on lyricism. The music is enjoyable enough but not too essential".

Track listing 
 "Almost Like Being in Love" (Frederick Loewe, Alan Jay Lerner) - 1:50
 "Knarf" (Mike Abene) - 4:30
 "Olé" (Maynard Ferguson, Slide Hampton) - 7:05
 "Dancing Nitely" (Bill Holman) - 5:05
 "Tenderly" (Walter Gross, Jack Lawrence) - 3:05
 "Whisper Not" (Benny Golson) - 6:20
 "Got the Spirit" (Hampton) - 9:25

Personnel 
Maynard Ferguson - trumpet
Rolf Schneebiegl - trumpet, flugelhorn
Siegfried Achhammer, Klaus Mitschele, Karl Sauter - trumpet
Heinz Hermannsdorfer, George Hohne, Gerhard Lachmann - trombone
Werner Betz - bass trombone
Werner Baumgart, Bernd Fischer - alto saxophone, clarinet
Bert Huseman - tenor saxophone, flute
Rudi Flierl - tenor saxophone, bass clarinet
Johnny Feigel - bass clarinet
Dieter Reith - piano
Jurgen Franke - guitar
Werner Schulze - bass
Herman Mutschler - drums
Rolf-Hans Mueller - conductor

References 

1968 albums
Maynard Ferguson albums
MPS Records albums